Trow is a ghost town in the town of Dewhurst, Clark County, Wisconsin, United States.

History
The community was named for A. S. Trow, a local landowner.

Notes

Geography of Clark County, Wisconsin
Ghost towns in Wisconsin